Habrocestum socotrense is a jumping spider species in the genus Habrocestum that lives on the Socotra Archipelago off the coast of the Yemen. Its species name is derived from the location where it was first identified in 2002.

References

Endemic fauna of Socotra
Salticidae
Spiders described in 2002
Spiders of Asia
Taxa named by Wanda Wesołowska